Julinho Mboane (born 27 January 1984) is a retired Mozambican football midfielder.

References

1984 births
Living people
Mozambican footballers
Mozambique international footballers
CD Costa do Sol players
Association football midfielders